Events in the year 1981 in Japan.

Incumbents
Emperor: Hirohito (Emperor Shōwa)
Prime Minister: Zenko Suzuki (L–Iwate)
 Chief Cabinet Secretary: Kiichi Miyazawa (L–Hiroshima)
 Chief Justice of the Supreme Court: Takaaki Hattori
 President of the House of Representatives: Hajime Fukuda (L–Fukui)
 President of the House of Councillors: Masatoshi Tokunaga (L–national)
 Diet sessions: 94th (regular session opened in December 1980, to June 6), 95th (extraordinary, September 24 to November 28), 96th (regular, December 21 to 1982, August 21)

Governors
Aichi Prefecture: Yoshiaki Nakaya 
Akita Prefecture: Kikuji Sasaki 
Aomori Prefecture: Masaya Kitamura 
Chiba Prefecture: Kiichi Kawakami (until 27 February); Takeshi Numata (starting 4 April)
Ehime Prefecture: Haruki Shiraishi 
Fukui Prefecture: Heidayū Nakagawa 
Fukuoka Prefecture: Hikaru Kamei 
Fukushima Prefecture: Isao Matsudaira 
Gifu Prefecture: Yosuke Uematsu 
Gunma Prefecture: Ichiro Shimizu 
Hiroshima Prefecture: Hiroshi Miyazawa (until 29 October); Toranosuke Takeshita (starting 29 October)
Hokkaido: Naohiro Dōgakinai 
Hyogo Prefecture: Tokitada Sakai
Ibaraki Prefecture: Fujio Takeuchi 
Ishikawa Prefecture: Yōichi Nakanishi 
Iwate Prefecture: 
Kagawa Prefecture: Tadao Maekawa 
Kagoshima Prefecture: Kaname Kamada 
Kanagawa Prefecture: Kazuji Nagasu 
Kochi Prefecture: Chikara Nakauchi  
Kumamoto Prefecture: Issei Sawada 
Kyoto Prefecture: Yukio Hayashida 
Mie Prefecture: Ryōzō Tagawa 
Miyagi Prefecture: Sōichirō Yamamoto 
Miyazaki Prefecture: Suketaka Matsukata 
Nagano Prefecture: Gorō Yoshimura 
Nagasaki Prefecture: Kan'ichi Kubo 
Nara Prefecture: Shigekiyo Ueda 
Niigata Prefecture: Takeo Kimi 
Oita Prefecture: Morihiko Hiramatsu 
Okayama Prefecture: Shiro Nagano 
Okinawa Prefecture: Junji Nishime 
Osaka Prefecture: Sakae Kishi
Saga Prefecture: Kumao Katsuki 
Saitama Prefecture: Yawara Hata 
Shiga Prefecture: Masayoshi Takemura 
Shiname Prefecture: Seiji Tsunematsu 
Shizuoka Prefecture: Keizaburō Yamamoto 
Tochigi Prefecture: Yuzuru Funada 
Tokushima Prefecture: Yasunobu Takeichi (until 4 October); Shinzo Miki (starting 5 October)
Tokyo: Shun'ichi Suzuki 
Tottori Prefecture: Kōzō Hirabayashi 
Toyama Prefecture: Yutaka Nakaoki
Wakayama Prefecture: Shirō Kariya  
Yamagata Prefecture: Seiichirō Itagaki 
Yamaguchi Prefecture: Toru Hirai 
Yamanashi Prefecture: Kōmei Mochizuki

Events
January to March - A heavy massive snowfall with avalanche hit around Japan, according to Japan Fire and Disaster Management Agency confirmed report, 152 peoples lost their lives, 2,158 peoples were wounded.    
March 31 - Pink Lady performs their farewell concert in the same stadium where Candies performed their concert 3 years earlier. 
October 10 - Ministry of Education issues jōyō kanji.
October 16 - Gas explosions at a coal mine in Hokutan, Yūbari, Hokkaido kill 93.
The first fully Automated guideway transit driverless people mover train technology in the world, introduced on Port Island Line, Kobe.

Popular culture

Arts and entertainment
In film, Station by Yasuo Furuhata won the Best film award at the Japan Academy Prize, Enrai by Kichitaro Negishi won Best film at the Hochi Film Awards, Muddy River by Kōhei Oguri won Best film at the Blue Ribbon Awards and Something Like It by Yoshimitsu Morita won Best film at the Yokohama Film Festival. For a list of Japanese films released in 1981 see Japanese films of 1981.

In manga,  the winners of the Shogakukan Manga Award were Sunset on Third Street by Ryōhei Saigan (general), Dr. Slump by Akira Toriyama (shōnen or shōjo) and Doraemon by Fujiko Fujio (children). Sanshirō of 1, 2 by Makoto Kobayashi (shōnen) and Ohayō! Spank by Shun'ichi Yukimuro and Shizue Takanashi (shōjo) won the Kodansha Manga Award. Kibun wa mou sensou by Katsuhiro Otomo won the Seiun Award for Best Comic of the Year. For a list of manga released in 1981 see :Category:1981 manga.

In music, the 32nd Kōhaku Uta Gassen was won by the White Team (men). Akira Terao won the FNS Music Festival.

In television, see: 1981 in Japanese television.

In radio, Japan FM Network, Japan's biggest FM radio network, was established in May 1981.

Sports
In athletics, Japan hosted the 1981 Asian Athletics Championships where it ranked 1st with 18 gold medals.

In football (soccer), Japan hosted the 1981 Intercontinental Cup. Fujita Engineering won the Japan Soccer League. For the champions of the regional leagues see: 1981 Japanese Regional Leagues.

In tennis, Japan hosted the Federation Cup, won by the United States.

Births
 January 4: Hitomi Sakamoto, wrestler
 January 6: Rinko Kikuchi, actress
 January 10: Kumiko Ikeda, long jumper
 January 14: Chiharu Niiyama, actress and model
 January 18: Naoyuki Daigo, athlete
 February 10: Yasuyuki Muneta, judoka
 February 12: Takashi Takusagawa, football player
 February 21: Jun Kaname, actor
 March 6
 Masakazu Fujiwara, long-distance runner
 Mizuki Watanabe, J-pop and rock singer
 March 18 – Shohei Tateyama, former professional baseball pitcher
 March 23: Takeshi Honda, figure skater
 March 31: Ryōko Shintani, voice actress and singer
 April 7: Kazuki Watanabe, musician (d. 2000)
 April 14: Shinjiro Koizumi, politician
 April 18: Mai Hoshimura, musician
 April 19: Kazuhiro Maeda, long-distance runner
 April 23: Megu Hirose, softball player
 May 8: Yasuko Tajima, medley swimmer
 May 12: Naohiro Ishikawa, footballer
 May 13: Hidenori Kato, footballer
 May 22: Fumina Hara, actress and idol
 May 23: Ema Tōyama, manga artist
 May 24: Sayaka Ando, gravure idol
 June 6: Daisuke Miyazaki, handball player
 June 8: Ai Nonaka, voice actress 
 June 18: Yurin, actress, voice actress and singer  
 July 27: Mari Hoshino, actress and singer
 August 4: Ayumi Tanimoto, judoka
 August 5: Kou Shibasaki, singer and actress
 August 10: Natsumi Abe, singer and actress
 August 15: Yoshiko Fujinaga, long-distance runner
 August 28: Aira Yuhki, J-pop singer
 September 19: Rika Fujiwara, tennis player
 September 22: Hiromitsu Miura, Boxer and former mixed martial artist
 September 23: Hiroka Yaginuma, wrestler
 September 26
Asuka, wrestler
Marica Hase, gravure model and pornographic actress
 October 6: Chiharu Icho, wrestler
 October 8: Ryuji Sainei, actor  
 October 17: Tsubasa Imai, singer, actor, and dancer
 October 25: Hiroshi Aoyama, motorcycle road racer 
 October 30
 Ayaka Kimura, actress and J-pop singer
 Eri Sendai, voice actress
 November 3: Ayako Shoda, wrestler
 November 7 
 Nana Katase, actress
 Rina Uchiyama, actress and idol
 December 8: Naoyuki Kotani, mixed martial artist
 December 19: Eriko Sato, actress and model
 December 29: Shizuka Arakawa, figure skater

Deaths
 January 8: Shigeru Egami, master of Shotokan karate
 February 11: Fusae Ichikawa, feminist, politician and women's suffrage leader
 February 25: Gunichi Mikawa, Vice-Admiral in the Imperial Japanese Navy
 April 9: Ichiro Nakayama, economist
 April 12: Prince Asaka Yasuhiko, founder of a collateral branch of the Japanese imperial family
 April 27: Koji Sone, judoka
 May 7: Hiromichi Yahara, senior staff officer
 July 4: Isao Kimura, actor
 July 19: Daisuke Itō, film director and screenwriter
 July 23: Kazuo Taoka, one of the yakuza Godfathers
 August 22: Kuniko Mukōda, screen writer (b. 1929)
 September 8: Hideki Yukawa, physicist
 September 14: Yasuji Kiyose, composer
 September 16: Akira Iwasaki, film critic, historian, and producer
 December 28: Seishi Yokomizo, author

See also
 1981 in Japanese television
 List of Japanese films of 1981

References

 
Japan
Years of the 20th century in Japan